Samuel Henry Gluckstein (4 January 1821 – 23 January 1873) was the founder of Salmon & Gluckstein tobacco merchants.

Early life
Samuel Henry Gluckstein was born in Rheinberg, Prussia (now Germany) on 4 January 1821, the son of Helena (Horn) and Asher Lehmann Gluckstein.

Career
Samuel Gluckstein left Prussia to come to London, where he established a cigar making factory in the East End.

Personal life
Samuel Gluckstein married Hannah Joseph of Amsterdam, Netherlands (1819–1895), and they had 11 children, four sons and seven daughters.

His sons were 
 Isidore Gluckstein
 Montague Gluckstein,  
 Joseph Gluckstein (1856–1930)
 Henry Gluckstein (1857–1914)

He died on 23 January 1873 in Whitechapel, London.

References

1821 births
1873 deaths
People from Wesel (district)
British merchants
19th-century German Jews
German emigrants to the United Kingdom
Samuel
19th-century British businesspeople